Hurricane Ida was the strongest landfalling tropical cyclone during the 2009 Atlantic hurricane season, crossing the coastline of Nicaragua with winds of . The remnants of the storm became a powerful nor'easter that caused widespread damage along coastal areas of the Mid-Atlantic States. Hurricane Ida weakened and became an extratropical cyclone in the northern Gulf of Mexico, before spreading across the southeastern United States. The remnants of Ida contributed to the formation of a nor'easter that significantly affected the eastern coast of the United States.

Numerous watches and warnings were issued during the hurricane's existence.  Areas from Panama to Maine were affected by either the storm or the nor'easter low. In Nicaragua, nearly 3,000 people evacuated coastal areas ahead of the storm. More extensive evacuations in Mexico relocated over 100,000 residents and tourists.  In the United States, several parishes in Louisiana and counties in Alabama and Florida declared a state of emergency because of fear of significant damage from the storm. Officials issued voluntary evacuations and most schools and non-emergency offices in the region closed.

In Central America, Ida brought heavy rainfall to parts of Costa Rica, Nicaragua and Honduras. Several people were reported missing in Nicaragua, however post-storm reports denied these claims. Thousands of buildings collapsed or sustained damage and roughly 40,000 people were left homeless. Damages from Ida in Nicaragua amounted to at least 46 million córdoba ($2.12 million US$). Aside from heavy rainfall in Mexico and Cuba, little impact from Ida was reported in either country. In the United States, the remnants caused substantial damage, mainly in the Mid-Atlantic States. One person was killed by Ida after drowning in rough seas, while six others lost their lives in various incidents related to the nor'easter. Widespread heavy rainfall led to numerous reports of flash flooding in areas from Mississippi to Maine. Overall, the two systems caused nearly $300 million in damage throughout the country.

Meteorological history

Hurricane Ida originated from a weak tropical wave that reached the western Caribbean on November 1, 2009. By November 2, the system spawned an area of low pressure north of Panama which moved very little over the following days. The low became increasingly organized within a favorable environment that allowed deep convection to develop. By November 4, the low had become sufficiently organized for the National Hurricane Center (NHC) to classify it as Tropical Depression Eleven. At this time, the tropical depression was situated just southwest of San Andrés Island. Convective banding features became increasingly defined throughout the day, and six hours after becoming a tropical depression, the system intensified into Tropical Storm Ida.

Light wind shear allowed Ida to quickly intensify as it slowly tracked towards the Nicaraguan coastline. Late on November 4, microwave satellite imagery depicted an eye-like featured forming within the storm. The storm tracked west-northwestward in response to a weak ridge over the north-central Caribbean Sea and a weak trough over the southwestern Gulf of Mexico; these features were also responsible for Ida's slow forward motion. Early on November 5, the storm intensified into a Category 1 hurricane on the Saffir–Simpson hurricane scale as it passed near the Corn Islands. After the hurricane moved inland, the high mountains of Nicaragua caused the convection associated with the hurricane to diminish, resulting in rapid weakening. Roughly 18 hours after landfall, Ida weakened to a tropical depression as it turned northward over Honduras.

Late on November 6, Ida re-emerged over water, entering the northwestern Caribbean Sea. Upon moving back over water, the storm quickly began to redevelop, with convection increasing around the center of circulation. Early on November 7, Ida restrengthened into a tropical storm as it tracked just west of due north. Very warm sea surface temperatures ahead of the system would have allowed for substantial intensification; however, wind shear over the area quickly increased, resulting in modest strengthening. Later that day, the storm turned northwestward in response to a strong trough over Mexico and a mid-level ridge extending from the Southeast United States to Hispaniola. As Ida neared the Yucatán Channel, an eye redeveloped and the storm quickly intensified into a hurricane.

Shortly thereafter, increasing wind shear and forward speed caused the storm to rapidly weaken to a tropical storm. Only a small area of convection remained near the center by the morning of November 9. Despite the strong shear, the storm quickly re-organized, attaining hurricane status for a third time during the afternoon. However, this intensification was short-lived as a combination of increasing wind shear and decreasing sea-surface temperatures induced weakening to a tropical storm within three hours.

By the morning of November 10, all of Ida's convection appeared displaced to the northeast and the forward motion of the storm slowed substantially. Additionally, the storm had begun to undergo an extratropical transition near the United States Gulf Coast. Shortly before making landfall near Dauphin Island, Alabama, the storm completed its extratropical transition. Ida crossed Mobile Bay shortly thereafter, and maximum winds decreased below gale-force. After slowly tracking eastward for several hours, the surface circulation of Ida dissipated over the Florida Panhandle, at 12:00 UTC on November 11. However, energy from the storm led to the formation of a new low off the coast of North Carolina. This new low quickly intensified and became a powerful nor'easter that caused substantial damage throughout the Mid-Atlantic States. The extratropical low weakened the following day and moved out to sea after stalling along the North Carolina Coastline. The remnants of the cyclone persisted through November 17, by which time it had moved over Atlantic Canada.

Preparations

Central America

Shortly after being designated as Tropical Storm Ida on November 4, the government of Nicaragua issued a tropical storm warning for the entire coastline of Nicaragua, and the government of Columbia also issued a warning for the nearby islands of San Andrés and Providencia. Later that day, a hurricane watch was declared for areas between Bluefields and the Nicaragua–Honduras border. As Ida moved closer to land, the tropical storm warning for San Andrés and Providencia was discontinued. Several hours later, the tropical storm warning and hurricane watch were modified to cover areas south of the Nicaragua–Honduras border to Puerto Cabezas and a hurricane warning was issued for areas south of Puerto Cabezas to Bluefields. After Ida made landfall in Nicaragua, all hurricane advisories were discontinued and replaced by a tropical storm warning. Shortly thereafter, a tropical storm watch was declared for areas along the Honduran coastline between Limón and the Nicaragua–Honduras border. However, all watches and warnings were discontinued once Ida weakened to a tropical depression on November 6.

About 1,100 of the evacuees were from Corn Island and Little Corn Island where their homes were not expected to hold up to hurricane-force winds. In Bluefields, roughly 1,100 people were evacuated to shelters. Authorities began stockpiling supplies such as food, blankets and water that could supply 20,000 people after the storm. Upon the formation of Ida, officials in Costa Rica placed most northern regions under a yellow alert. Personnel from the Costa Rican Red Cross were also placed on standby. In El Salvador, officials raised the disaster alert level to green, the lowest stage of alert, on November 5. As Ida neared the coastline of Nicaragua, officials in Honduras warned residents of the likelihood of heavy rainfall from the storm. In response to this, the country's disaster alert level was raised to yellow.

Northern Caribbean

On November 7, Tropical Depression Ida re-entered the Caribbean Sea and restrengthened into a tropical storm, prompting the NHC to issue a tropical storm watch for areas between San Felipe, Yucatán and Punta Allen in Mexico as well as in Pinar del Río Province, Cuba. Several hours later, the watches were upgraded to warnings and a new tropical storm warning was declared for Grand Cayman. A tropical storm watch was also issued for Isla de la Juventud and a hurricane watch for areas between Tulum and Cabo Catoche, Mexico. Early on November 8, the tropical storm warning and hurricane watch for Mexico were modified to include areas from Punta Allen to Playa del Carmen and Tulum to Playa del Carmen respectively. A hurricane warning was also declared for areas between Playa del Carmen and Cabo Catoche. Later that day, the tropical storm warning for Grand Cayman was discontinued as Ida moved away from the island. Early on November 9, all watches and warnings for Cuba and Mexico were discontinued as Ida moved into the Gulf of Mexico and towards the United States.

In Mexico, officials declared a yellow alert, moderate hazard, as Hurricane Ida neared the Yucatán Peninsula on November 9. Roughly 36,000 tourists and 1,500 residents were evacuated from coastal areas of Quintana Roo. The Mexican Navy was placed on standby to assist in relief efforts once the storm had passed. Later that day, the alert was raised to red, the highest level, as hurricane-force winds and heavy rains threatened the region. A total of 95 shelters were opened in the state to house the evacuees.

United States

As Hurricane Ida moved over the Yucatán Channel on November 8, the NHC issued a hurricane watch for areas between Grand Isle, Louisiana and Mexico Beach, Florida. As the storm moved closer to the states, a tropical storm warning was declared for areas between Grand Isle and Pascagoula, Mississippi, as well as areas between Indian Pass, Florida, and the mouth of the Aucilla River. The hurricane watch was also modified to encompass a smaller area, between Grand Isle and Pascagoula. A hurricane warning was also issued from Pascagoula to Indian Pass. During the afternoon of November 9, all hurricane watches and warnings were discontinued and the tropical storm warning was modified to include areas between Grand Isle and the mouth of the Aucilla River. As Ida became extratropical, the NHC discontinued all watches and warnings on the storm on November 10.

Due to the threat of large swells, several oil rigs along the Texas coastline were evacuated as a precautionary measure. Workers from Chevron Corporation and Anadarko Petroleum were evacuated from offshore platforms while those working for ConocoPhillips and ExxonMobil remained on site. The Louisiana Offshore Oil Port was also shut down on November 9 as a result of Ida's passage. As a result of the decreased oil production, the price of oil rose more than $1 to $78 per barrel.  Among the rigs that were damaged was the Transocean Marianas which was drilling the Macondo well.  That vessel would be replaced on the Macondo Well by the Deepwater Horizon, which caused the Deepwater Horizon oil spill in 2010.

On November 8, Lafourche Parish, Louisiana president, Charlotte Randolph, declared a state of emergency for the parish as the storm approached the United States Gulf Coast. Although no evacuations were issued, all schools and government offices were closed through November 10. Voluntary evacuations were issued for residents in Plaquemines Parish along coastal areas. The Belle Chasse Auditorium was converted into a shelter to house evacuees for the duration of the storm. Grand Isle mayor David Carmadelle issued voluntary evacuation orders for residents in recreational vehicles and trailers on the island. Nearly 1,400 families still living in temporary FEMA homes in Louisiana, in the wake of Hurricanes Katrina and Rita, were urged to stay at home.

In Baldwin County, Alabama, a local state of emergency was declared on November 9 as Ida neared landfall. Voluntary evacuations were declared for residents living along coastal areas or in mobile homes. All government offices were closed until November 10 due to the storm. The Baldwin County Coliseum was converted into a shelter to house possible evacuees during the storm as well. In Mississippi, officials advised residents to remain vigilant and discussed possible evacuations. Residents living near Pensacola Beach, Florida, and nearby Perdido Key were urged to evacuate. On November 8, emergency officials declared a state of emergency in Escambia County. The following day, Walton County was also placed under a state of emergency ahead of Hurricane Ida's arrival. Voluntary evacuations were issued for residents in low-lying areas and all non-emergency offices were closed until November 10. The Freeport High School gymnasium was converted into a shelter to house evacuees.

Impact and aftermath

Nicaragua

Throughout Nicaragua, rainfall produced by the storm was significantly less than anticipated according to satellite derived estimates. The most severe damage took place in Karawala and Corn Island, near where the storm made landfall. On Corn Island, 40 homes, 3 schools and a church were destroyed and the electrical and water grids were severely disrupted. Roughly 6,000 people from the municipalities of Sandy Bay, Karawala, Kukra Hilla, Laguna de Perlas, El Tortuguero and the mouth of the Rio Grande were evacuated to 54 shelters during the storm. Officials stated that 42 people along the Miskito Coast were unaccounted for as they refused to evacuate before the storm. The day after Ida passed through, officials began to assess the full extent of the hurricane's damage. An estimated 40,000 people were left homeless throughout the country and one person was listed as missing. Mayors of severely affected towns reported that there were numerous injuries, missing persons and extensive property damage. In Nicaragua, there were no confirmed fatalities as a result of Ida.

Damage from Ida in Nicaragua was estimated to be at least 46 million Nicaraguan córdoba (US$2.12 million). A total of 1,334 people were injured by the storm throughout the country. Final damage assessments from the Nicaraguan Government for mainland Nicaragua were completed on November 12. A government report said that 283 homes were destroyed and 1,899 others damaged; 1,184 latrines were destroyed and 444 were damaged, and 476 wells were destroyed and 1,139 were damaged.

Shortly after the storm moved inland, 700 civil defense personnel were deployed to the affected region; however, due to damaged roads and poor travel conditions, they struggled to reach isolated regions. The Nicaraguan army supplied relief crews with four helicopters and two AN-2 aircraft for damage surveillance and search-and-rescue missions in the wake of Ida. The government of Nicaragua allocated roughly $4.4 million in relief funds for those affected by the storm. Several agencies from the United Nations provided residents affected by the storm with relief supplies and donated disaster funds to the country. The United Nations Population Fund provided $49,000 in funds; the World Food Programme deployed several rescue vehicles and logistics teams; UNICEF also provided logistics assistance in the country. OCHA provided $2 million in relief funds; the Government of Sweden provided 400,000 Swedish kronor (US$55,946) for sanitation and health supplies; the Netherlands Red Cross also donated 20,000 euros (US$27,226) for non-food items.

Elsewhere in Central America

In Costa Rica, the outer bands of Ida brought torrential rainfall, triggering isolated landslides. One of these landslides damaged three homes, leading to officials evacuating five families. Homes near Los Diques de Cartago were flooded and the sewage system was damaged, resulting in overflow. In Veraguas Province, Panama, severe flooding displaced more 400 people after 84 homes were inundated up to their roofs. A flooding disaster that killed 124 people in El Salvador was initially attributed to Hurricane Ida, although the National Hurricane Center quickly affirmed that the event resulted from a separate tropical low-pressure system in the Pacific. After weakening to a tropical storm, Ida moved over Honduras, where widespread heavy rains fell. These rains caused some rivers in the country to swell, but none overflowed its banks. In northern areas of Honduras, minor flooding and fallen trees were reported.

Northern Caribbean
In Cuba, the outer bands of Ida produced widespread heavy rainfall across western areas of the country. Several rivers were swollen due to the rains, including the Cuyaguateje River, which overflowed its banks and flooded nearby areas. In the Yucatán Peninsula, significantly less rain fell due to the asymmetrical structure of Ida even though the peninsula was relatively close to the storm. Isla Holbox, recorded substantial flooding, with roughly 70 percent of the island underwater. However, only minor damage was reported. Little to no beach erosion was sustained in coastal cities such as Cancún; however, over 50,000 tourists were evacuated from Chetumal, Quintana Roo, during the storm. The outer bands of Hurricane Ida also affected Grand Cayman.

United States

Ahead of Ida's arrival in the United States, a tight pressure gradient between the hurricane and a high-pressure system over the southeastern states resulted in strong winds across southern Florida. These winds, reaching  in gusts, caused moderate damage in parts of the state. Roughly 3,000 people were left without power in Miami-Dade, Broward and Palm Beach counties. Several trees were reported to have been downed and some uprooted. One car was struck by a broken tree limb during the event. Due to the sailing vessels non-response to VHF communications, a USCG helicopter was despatched a short while before the eye of the system arrived in the area. However, the crew refused evacuation, and later managed to arrive, somewhat damaged, in St. Augustine. Additionally, moderate beach erosion was reported in counties along the Gulf Coast. A maximum rainfall of  fell in Pensacola. Coastal and inland flooding resulted in numerous road closures and schools and non-governmental offices were closed on November 10. Following the storm, a local state of emergency was declared in Wakulla County. Throughout Florida, damage from the storm amounted to $265,000.

In Alabama, where Ida made landfall, heavy rains resulted in widespread flash flooding. Several roads in coastal counties were closed after being covered by high water. Heavy rains in central areas of the state also resulted in moderate flooding. In addition to the storm's heavy rains, waves up to  caused severe damage along coastal regions. The Gulf State Park Pier near Gulf Shores, recently re-opened after being destroyed by Hurricane Ivan in 2004, was damaged. Damage from beach erosion and coastal resorts amounted to roughly $9 million in the state.

Before making landfall in Alabama, Hurricane Ida brushed southeastern Louisiana, bringing light to moderate rains and increased surf to the state. Offshore, one person drowned after attempting to assist a boat that let out a distress signal during the storm. The levee collapse led to minor flooding and threatened three homes. Although not solely caused by Ida, high tides along the Texas coastline led to a few road closures.

Minor effects from Ida were also experienced in Mississippi, Georgia and Tennessee. In Mississippi,  of rain fell in Waynesboro. Some flooding was reported in areas near the Alabama border while winds of up to  brought down trees. Heavy rainfall from the storm affected much of Georgia, with a large swath of  falling in northern parts of the state. Additionally, minor rains affected parts of eastern Tennessee, totaling  on Mount Le Conte.

Nor'easter

Along the east coast of the United States, a nor'easter involving the remnants of Ida resulted in widespread damage along coastal areas. In North Carolina strong winds downed several trees loosened in saturated soil. In Rockingham County, one person was killed after being struck by a branch while driving. Four homes were destroyed along the Outer Banks, and over 500 others were damaged, leaving at least $5.8 million in losses. Widespread coastal damage and flooding took place in Virginia, as rainfall exceeding  fell in many places and large waves battered beaches. In some areas, roads were closed multiple times due to flooding. Some areas reported a storm surge comparable to that of Hurricanes Gloria in 1985 and Isabel in 2003. Damage from the storm in Virginia was estimated to be at least $38.8 million, of which $25 million was in Norfolk alone. In New York, one person drowned after being caught in rough seas off Rockaway Beach. Total beach losses in the state reached $8.2 million.

See also

2009 Atlantic hurricane season
Timeline of the 2009 Atlantic hurricane season
Hurricane Nate (2017)

References

External links

The National Hurricane Center's Advisory Archive for Hurricane Ida
The Hydrometeorological Prediction Center's Advisory Archive for the remnants of Hurricane Ida

The Hydrometeorological Prediction Center's Report on Hurricane Ida
 Emergency reports for Central America related to Hurricane Ida and the El Salvador floods and mudslides
The National Climatic Data Center's Storm Event Database

2009 Atlantic hurricane season
Category 2 Atlantic hurricanes
Hurricanes in El Salvador
Hurricanes in Honduras
Hurricanes in Nicaragua
Hurricanes in Florida
Hurricanes in Louisiana
Hurricanes in Mississippi
Hurricanes in Alabama
Atlantic hurricanes in Mexico
Hurricanes in Cuba
Hurricanes in Costa Rica
Hurricanes in Panama
Articles containing video clips
Tropical cyclones in 2009